Ana Montero (born 7 November 1980) is a Spanish swimming coach and former synchronized swimmer who competed in the 2004 Summer Olympics. where she was part of the Spanish team that finished fourth in the team event. She also took a World Championship silver medal and three European Championship medals during her career. After retiring from competition she joined the Royal Spanish Swimming Federation as a coach, initially at junior level, before being appointed technical director for the national team in September 2012.

References

1980 births
Living people
Spanish synchronized swimmers
Olympic synchronized swimmers of Spain
Synchronized swimmers at the 2004 Summer Olympics
Spanish swimming coaches